Long Wharf may refer to some locations in the United States:

Long Wharf (Boston), Massachusetts (built 1710)
Long Wharf (New Haven), Connecticut
Oakland Long Wharf, California
Long Wharf (Portland, Maine)
Long Wharf (San Francisco), California
Long Wharf (Santa Monica), California (historic, 1893-1933)

See also
 Long Wharf Theatre, a nonprofit institution in New Haven, Connecticut